"Bad to the Bone" is a song by American blues rock band George Thorogood and the Destroyers, released in 1982 on the album of the same name by EMI America Records. The song adapts the hook and lyrics of Muddy Waters' 1955 song "Mannish Boy". While "Bad to the Bone" was not widely popular upon its initial release, its music video made recurrent appearances on MTV, created a year before. Licensing for films, television, and commercials has since made the song more popular. Author Jim Beviglia opined that despite the song not landing on the Hot 100 chart, it "outstrips all other 80s songs in terms of the way it has essentially become cultural shorthand".

Music video
The video intercuts a live performance by Thorogood and his band with his playing a lengthy game of pool with Bo Diddley. Pool player Willie Mosconi is summoned from another room by a spectator (played by Michael Fusco), and he wagers a large sum of money on Diddley. As Thorogood appears to be winning, a group of children outside celebrate while Diddley gets a dirty look from Mosconi.

Thorogood smokes a cigar throughout the pool-playing sequence. The video ends with Thorogood making the 8 ball drop into a pocket by flicking a large quantity of cigar ash on the floor, apparently triggering the drop of the ball in the pocket.

Personnel
George Thorogood – vocals and electric guitar
Ian Stewart – piano
Hank Carter – saxophone
Billy Blough – bass
Jeff Simon – drums

In popular culture

Film and television
The song has been used in filmmaking and television productions, often as a tongue-in-cheek comedic device when a "bad guy" needs to be introduced or identified. An example of this is in the opening of the movie Christine, where the song is played as the red and white 1958 Plymouth Fury rolls down the production line and injures an inspector,  and again in the ending shot when a piece of Christine's grille moves. The song was used in the bar scene in Terminator 2: Judgment Day where the Terminator first is shown in his full leather outfit. It can also be heard in the card game scene from the remake of The Parent Trap. The song was used in the 1988 drama film Talk Radio in the scenes where radio talk show host Barry Champlain's radio show, used as the opening and closing theme of his radio show. It was also used in the 2010 computer-animated superhero movie, Megamind. It was the title theme to Problem Child and its sequel, and Major Payne. It is also included in the South Park episode "You're Not Yelping" while Cartman walks down a hallway. It is also played during Shaun the Sheep Movie after Shaun is caught by Animal Containment.

The song was played in the episode of Who's the Boss?, "The Two Tonys", when Tony Micelli was playing pool against another guy named Tony Petardi (husband of Darlene, Tony Micelli's ex-girlfriend) and tries to beat him.

The song was used many times in Married... with Children, when Al Bundy does something fun, usually followed by the line "Let's Rock." For example, in "Hot off the Grill", "A Man's Castle", "Heels on Wheels" episodes.

The song was referenced in the episode of Family Matters, "Crash Course", by Steve Urkel when Eddie Winslow crashed the family station wagon in the living room without a driver's license. Urkel stated that he is bad to the bone and that bad is his middle name.

The song was referenced and background music was playing in the episode of Step By Step, "Something Wild" when Mark Foster dressed up for their Halloween party as a rebel to impress the prettiest girl in his school he invited to the part.

The song was played in the episode of The Fresh Prince of Bel-Air, "I Bowl Buster", when Will Smith and Carlton Banks go bowling to celebrate Carlton's acceptance to Princeton University and is played through the times Carlton struggles to bowl and causes multiple mishaps and injuries for him and Will.

Alvin and the Chipmunks covered the song for the episode "Alvin's Oldest Fan" from their TV series.  It was also featured in the episode "Endless Summer" of the series Renegade. Almost the entire record can be heard at the beginning of the episode "Nobody Lives Forever" on the TV series Miami Vice.  An episode of Disney's TV show 101 Dalmatians: The Series has an episode named after the song.

In the Family Guy episode "PeTerminator", a terminator resembling Peter Griffin steals some clothes and a motorcycle. While the music in the background is "Bad to the Bone", the terminator instead says, "B-B-B-B-Bird... B-B-B-B-Bird... B-B-B-B-Bird... B-Bird is the word..." in reference to the running gag of Peter's love of "Surfin' Bird" by the Trashmen.

Rudy Giuliani performed the song in Season 7, Episode 7 of The Masked Singer. His performance led judge Ken Jeong to walk off set.

Uses in film
"Bad to the Bone" has been used in many films, such as:
 Slayground (1983)
 Christine (1983)
 The Color Of Money (1986)
 Lethal Weapon (1987)
 Bull Durham (1988)
 Talk Radio (1988)
 Problem Child (1990)
 Terminator 2: Judgment Day (1991)
 Problem Child 2 (1991)
 Flesh and Bone (1993)
 Major Payne (1995)
 The Parent Trap (1998)
 3000 Miles to Graceland (2001)
 Joe Dirt (2001)
 Firehouse Dog (2007)
 Beverly Hills Chihuahua (2008)
 Beautiful Kate (2009)
 Lucky Luke (2009)
 Transylmania (2009)
 Cats & Dogs: The Revenge of Kitty Galore (2010)
 Megamind (2010)
 The Muppets (2011)
 It Boy (2013)
 Shaun the Sheep Movie (2015)
 Man Up (2015)
 Huevos: Little Rooster's Egg-cellent Adventure (2015)
 It's For Your Own Good (2017)

Sporting events
The song is used by Dennis Anderson's Grave Digger monster truck as entrance music, and plays during his portion of the freestyle round at Monster Jam events, and as an entrance theme for closing pitcher Takashi Saito of the Los Angeles Dodgers. It was also played during every at bat of former Seattle Mariners slugger Jay Buhner and former Atlanta Braves and San Diego Padres slugger Ryan Klesko.

The song is also used by 2-Time World Champion Professional bull rider J. B. Mauney.

The song is also used as an entrance theme song in professional wrestling. Multiple wrestlers have used it as their theme song, such as L. A. Park in Mexico, Kevin Wacholz, who used the song in the 1980s as "Mr. Magnificent" Kevin Kelly while wrestling for the American Wrestling Association, and Gino Hernandez and Chris Adams as "The Dynamic Duo" in World Class Championship Wrestling in Texas. American mixed martial artist Phil Baroni used it as his entrance song at UFC 106. It was also used by The Bad Crew.

The song is used in the home matches of HIFK (a Finnish professional ice hockey team competing in the Liiga) when HIFK acquires a penalty.

Other media
On October 7, 2008, the song was released as downloadable content for the music video game series Rock Band. It also featured in Rock Band Track Pack: Classic Rock. The video game Rock 'n Roll Racing also uses it.

The song has also been used as a theme song for Mr. Bungle.

Talk show host Bill Cunningham uses the song as the opening intro to his afternoon talk show on WLW in Cincinnati, Ohio, and on his Sunday night radio show. The song "E.V.I.L. B.O.Y.S." from the hit Disney show Phineas and Ferb sampled the base melody of the song to give it a blues sound.

Thorogood appeared in a UPS commercial, convincing NASCAR driver Dale Jarrett to race the brown delivery truck, and rewriting the lyrics as "Brown to the Bone", in 2002.

Authorship claim
Chicago area musician James Pobiega, who goes by the stage name "Little Howlin' Wolf", has claimed that he wrote "Bad to the Bone" and that Thorogood stole it from him. The song is influenced by Muddy Waters' "Mannish Boy". Thorogood initially offered the song to Waters, who rejected it outright.

References

1982 singles
1982 songs
EMI America Records singles
George Thorogood songs